Richmond Hill is a provincial electoral district in Ontario, Canada, that has been represented in the Legislative Assembly of Ontario since the 2007 provincial election.

It was created in 2003 from parts of Oak Ridges riding.

Geography
The riding includes the neighbourhoods of Elgin Mills, Bayview North, Bayview South, North Richvale, Hillsview, Bayview Hill, South Richvale, Langstaff and Doncrest in the City of Richmond Hill.

It consists of the part of the City of Richmond Hill lying south and west of a line drawn from west to east along Gamble Road, south along Yonge Street, and east along Elgin Mills Road East.

Members of Provincial Parliament

Election results

2007 electoral reform referendum

Sources

Elections Ontario Past Election Results
Map of riding for 2018 election

Ontario provincial electoral districts
Politics of Richmond Hill, Ontario